The R475 road, known as the Kilrush Road, is a regional road in Ireland, located in central County Clare.

References

Regional roads in the Republic of Ireland
Roads in County Clare